Cotton Plateau is a snow-covered plateau just east of the mouth of Marsh Glacier, in the Queen Elizabeth Range. It was named by the northern party of the New Zealand Geological Survey Antarctic Expedition (1961–62) for Sir Charles Cotton, noted New Zealand geomorphologist and authority on glacial landforms.

References
 

Plateaus of Oates Land